Genuiyeh (also Romanized as Genū’īyeh, Ganū’īyeh, and Gonū’īyeh; also known as Gūnū’īyeh, Gūtū’īyeh, and Kanū’īyeh) is a village in Kiskan Rural District, in the Central District of Baft County, Kerman Province, Iran. At the 2006 census, its population was 212, in 63 families.

References 

Populated places in Baft County